Yasuhiko Takahashi (髙橋靖彦, born May 12, 1985) is a Japanese wheel gymnastics acrobat. He has won 3 World Champion Titles, 7 Japanese Champion Titles. He also works for the basketball team, Akita Northern Happinets. At the age of 19, he was injured as a baseball player, and shifted to a wheel athlete. His technique of
fast spinnig is called "Oisa Tornade". Oisa is festival shout of Kakunodate Matsuri.

Successes

World Champion
 2013 Chicago, All Around
 2014 Berlin, with the Japanese National Team
 2015 Lignano, All Around 
 2015 Lignano, ,Straightline
 2015 Lignano, ,Vault
 2016 Cincinnati, Straightline 
 2018 Magglingen, All Around
 2018 Magglingen, Vault
 2018 Magglingen, Spiral

References

External links
Official site

1985 births
Living people
Akita Northern Happinets
Japanese acrobatic gymnasts
Sportspeople from Akita Prefecture